Scrobipalpa mixta is a moth in the family Gelechiidae. It was described by Peter Huemer and Ole Karsholt in 2010. It is found in North Macedonia, Albania and Ukraine.

References

Scrobipalpa
Moths described in 2010